Tokusaburo Iwata (born 18 February 1901) was a Japanese sport shooter who competed in the 1956 Summer Olympics.

References

1901 births
Year of death missing
Japanese male sport shooters
Trap and double trap shooters
Olympic shooters of Japan
Shooters at the 1956 Summer Olympics
Shooters at the 1954 Asian Games
Asian Games medalists in shooting
Medalists at the 1954 Asian Games
Asian Games silver medalists for Japan
20th-century Japanese people